The 14037 / 14038 Poorvottar Sampark Kranti Express is an Sampark Kranti Express train belonging to Northern Railway zone that runs between  and  in India. It is currently being operated with 14037/14038 train numbers on a weekly basis.

The train is named as Poorvottar Express since it connects New Delhi with the north east region of the country, known as Poorvottar in Hindi. This second Sampark Kranti Express from Assam after Poorvottar Sampark Kranti Express

Service

The 14037/Poorvottar Sampark Kranti Express has an average speed of 54 km/hr and covers 2279 km in 42h 30m. The 14038/Poorvottar Sampark Kranti Express has an average speed of 51 km/hr and covers 2279 km in 45h.

Schedule

Route & halts

The important halts of the train are:

Coach composition

The train has LHB rake with a max speed of 110 kmph. The train consists of 21 coaches:

 1 First AC
 1 AC II Tier
 4 AC III Tier
 8 Sleeper coaches
 1 Pantry car
 4 Unreserved
 1 Luggage cum Generator car
 1 Luggage cum Guard cum Second Class seating car

Traction

Rake sharing

The train shares its rake with 22449/22450 Poorvottar Sampark Kranti Express.

Direction reversal

The train reverses its direction 2 times:

See also 

 Silchar railway station
 New Delhi railway station
 Poorvottar Sampark Kranti Express

Notes

References

External links 

 15601/Poorvottar Sampark Kranti Express India Rail Info
 15602/Poorvottar Sampark Kranti Express India Rail Info

Transport in Silchar
Transport in Delhi
Sampark Kranti Express trains
Rail transport in Uttar Pradesh
Rail transport in Bihar
Rail transport in West Bengal
Rail transport in Assam
Rail transport in Delhi
Railway services introduced in 2016